Lilia Paule Garcia Pineda (born February 21, 1951), also known as Nanay Baby, is a Filipina politician who has been serving as Vice Governor of Pampanga under her son Dennis Pineda since 2019. She previously served as Governor of the province from 2010 until 2019 as Mayor of Lubao from 1992 until 2001. Pineda was a close ally of Gloria Macapagal-Arroyo during the latter's presidency from 2001 to 2010.

Pineda is married to businessman and alleged "gambling lord" Rodolfo "Bong" Pineda.

References

1951 births
Living people
21st-century Filipino politicians
Filipino Roman Catholics
Governors of Pampanga
José Rizal University alumni
People from Pampanga